is a Japanese voice actor from Osaka Prefecture, Japan. He works at Production Baobab.

He is known for the roles of Ramba Ral (Mobile Suit Gundam), Rikishiman (Kinnikuman), Gosterro (Blue Comet SPT Layzner) and Nakano-sensei (Lovely Complex).

In September 2014, Hirose was hospitalized for an unspecified illness. As a result, he was replaced by Katsuhisa Hōki in Gundam Build Fighters Try, Banjō Ginga in One Piece, and Akio Ōtsuka in In Search of the Lost Future.

Filmography

Anime television

Original Video Animations
Armored Trooper Votoms: Big Battle (Radah Neeva) (1986)
Gunbuster (Admiral Yuzo Takaya) (1988)
Legend of the Galactic Heroes (1989) (Arthur Lynch)
Mobile Suit Gundam: The 08th MS Team (1996) (Baresto Rosita)
The Silent Service (Keisuke Hamamoto, Aleksei) (1997-1998)
Getter Robo Armageddon (Stinger) (1998)
Hellsing Ultimate (Sir Penwood) (2008)
Kenichi: The Mightiest Disciple (James Shiba) (2012-2014)

Anime films
Mobile Suit Gundam (1981) (Ramba Ral)
Mobile Suit Gundam: Soldiers of Sorrow (1981) (Ramba Ral)
Mobile Suit Gundam: Encounters in Space (1982) (Ramba Ral)
Kinnikuman film series (Rikishiman, The Ninja, Kendaman, others) (1984-1986)
My Neighbor Totoro (1988) (Kanta's Father)
Mobile Suit Gundam: The 08th MS Team, Miller's Report (Jacob) (1998)
Doraemon: Nobita and the Legend of the Sun King (2000) (Coretol)

Tokusatsu
Ultraman Zoffy: Ultra Warriors vs. the Giant Monster Army (1984) (Alien Temperor, Alien Baltan II)
Garo Special: Byakuya no Maju (2006) (Horror Legules)

Video games
Mobile Suit Gundam (Ramba Ral) (1981)
Armored Trooper Votoms: Udo Kumen Arc (Kan Yu) (1983)
Mobile Suit Gundam: Gihren's Greed (Ramba Ral) (1998)
Ikusagami (2005) (Takeda Shingen)
Radiata Stories (Dynas Stone) (2005)
Yoake Mae yori Ruri Iro na (Lioness Teo Arshlight) (2006)
Dragon Quest Swords: The Masked Queen and the Tower of Mirrors (Minister of Alsword) (2007)
Infinite Undiscovery (Enma) (2008)
Super Robot Wars series (Ramba Ral, Gosterro, Kan Yu, Dr. Stinger) (2008-2019)
Fallout: New Vegas (Robert House) (2010)
Professor Layton vs. Ace Attorney (Story Teller) (2012)
Tales of Vesperia (Barbos, Leblanc) (2019)

Dubbing

Other voices
Star Tours – The Adventures Continue (Boba Fett)

References

External links
Official profile 
 
 Masashi Hirose at GamePlaza-Haruka Voice Acting Database 
 Masashi Hirose at Hitoshi Doi's Seiyuu Database 

1948 births
Living people
Japanese male video game actors
Japanese male voice actors
Male voice actors from Osaka Prefecture
Production Baobab voice actors